Pomaderris halmaturina, commonly known as Kangaroo Island pomaderris, is a species of flowering plant in the family Rhamnaceae and is endemic to southern continental Australia. It is a shrub with narrowly elliptic to egg-shaped leaves with toothed or wavy edges, and sparse panicles of hairy, yellowish-green flowers.

Description
The upper surface of the leaves is more or less glabrous and the lower surface is densely covered with woolly, star-shaped hairs. Flowering occurs in October and November.

Taxonomy
Pomaderris halmaturina was first formally described in 1925 by John McConnell Black in Transactions and Proceedings of the Royal Society of South Australia from specimens collected on Kangaroo Island. Halmaturus is an old name for a genus of kangaroos.

In 1990, Neville Grant Walsh described two subspecies and the names are accepted by the Australian Plant Census:
 Pomaderris halmaturina subsp. continentis N.G.Walsh has leaves with wavy rather than toothed edges, and smaller flowers than the autonym;
 Pomaderris halmaturina J.M.Black subsp. halmaturina is listed as "vulnerable" under the Australian Government Environment Protection and Biodiversity Conservation Act 1999.

Distribution and habitat
Subspecies continentis usually grows in forest or scrub on limestone soils and occurs along the coast of south-eastern South Australia, south-western Victoria and near Torquay and is listed as "rare". Subspecies halmaturina is restricted to Kangaroo Island.

References

halmaturina
Flora of Victoria (Australia)
Flora of South Australia
Plants described in 1925